Lachezar Hristov Kotev (born 5 January 1998) is a Bulgarian professional footballer who plays as a midfielder for Russian club Khimki.

Club career
On 11 February 2023, Kotev signed a two-and-a-half-year contract with Russian Premier League club Khimki.

International career

Youth levels
In August 2018 he was called up for the Bulgaria U21 team for the 2019 UEFA European Under-21 Championship qualification matches against France U21 and Montenegro U21 to be held on 7 and 11 September 2018.

Senior level
Kotev received his first call up for the Bulgaria national team on 14 May 2021 for the friendly games against Slovakia, Russia and France between 1 June and 8 June.

Career statistics

Club

References

1998 births
Footballers from Sofia
Living people
Bulgarian footballers
Association football midfielders
Bulgaria under-21 international footballers
FC Septemvri Sofia players
FC Vitosha Bistritsa players
FC Oborishte players
FC Arda Kardzhali players
First Professional Football League (Bulgaria) players
Second Professional Football League (Bulgaria) players
Bulgarian expatriate footballers
Expatriate footballers in Russia
Bulgarian expatriate sportspeople in Russia